Made in Brazil may refer to:

 Made in Brazil (album), by Eliane Elias 
 Made in Brazil (esports)